Canadian Pacific 1293 is a class "G5d" 4-6-2 "Pacific" type steam locomotive built in June 1948 by the Canadian Locomotive Company for the Canadian Pacific Railway. Built for passenger service, 1293 served an eight-year career until being replaced by diesel locomotives where it was then retired in 1959. Purchased in 1964 by F. Nelson Blount for use at his Steamtown site in Bellows Falls, Vermont, 1293 was easily restored to operation for hauling fan trips for the general public. 1293 was later sold to the Ohio Central Railroad in 1996 for tourist train service. Today, the locomotive is out on display at the Age of Steam Roundhouse in Sugarcreek, Ohio.

History

Revenue service 
It was built in June 1948 by Canadian Locomotive Company. It was retired in 1959 after only eight years of service when diesel power made it obsolete. This was one of three type 4-6-2, class G5 light weight "Pacific" locomotives that were operational at the time that Steamtown, U.S.A. was in Bellows Falls. The other two G-5s of Steamtown were Nos 1246 and 1278. The Steamtown Special History Study gave no details of the operational career of 1293, but said that Blount purchased it under the name of Green Mountain Railroad in January 1964.

Steamtown
The Steamtown Foundation purchased the locomotive from Green Mountain Railroad in 1973 and rebuilt it in 1976. Making its debut as an excursion train in June of that year and sporting a green and black color scheme, 1293 served the state of Vermont as its "Bicentennial Train", logging . Leased by the state of Vermont for  excursions that were scheduled for the entire year, the engine was dubbed "The Spirit of Ethan Allen".

In 1980, the locomotive was renumbered "1881", painted black with silver stripes, and leased to a Hollywood company for use in the filming of the horror movie Terror Train (1980), starring Jamie Lee Curtis. In 1980, the locomotive was repainted with a color scheme used by Canadian Pacific in the 1930s. The black, gold and Tuscan red paint job was popular with railroad enthusiasts and photographers. The number 1293 was also restored to the engine. In February 1982, the headlights, handrails and cab roof of 1293 were damaged when the roof of a Steamtown storage building gave way to heavy snow. Meadow River Lumber Company 1 was also damaged in the roof collapse. After some repairs were made to the locomotive, it operated multiple excursion trains throughout the 1983 season alongside No. 1246 and No. 2317 to bid farewell to Steamtown's former home of Bellows Falls, before the entire collection would be moved to Scranton, Pennsylvania the following year.

Although the Steamtown Special History Study reasoned that, since this type of locomotive had historically operated in New England, perhaps as far south as Boston, it qualified to be part of the federal government's collection, the Canadian native sat unused for 12 years following the move to Scranton.

Ohio Central Railroad
Ohio Central Railroad System purchased it in 1996 and it underwent a 13-month restoration. On September 18, 1997, the locomotive was restored to operating condition and found itself on a new lease on life by pulling excursion trains out of Sugarcreek, Ohio alongside other locomotives, including Canadian National 4-6-0 No. 1551 (which is also a former relic of Steamtown, USA), Buffalo Creek and Gauley 2-8-0 No. 13, Grand Trunk Western 4-8-4 No. 6325, and Lake Superior and Ishpeming 2-8-0 No. 33. The year 2004 saw a huge event in Ohio Central's steam operations when "Train festival 2004" took place from July 30 to August 1, 2004, in Dennison, Ohio. It was a major event featuring all of the OC's steam locomotives, some historic diesel locomotives as well as rolling stock, and many more rail-related activities, and No. 1293 took part in the event.

No. 1293 was loaned to the Cuyahoga Valley Scenic Railroad to operate between Independence and Akron in the late 2000s and 2012.

Disposition

Ohio Central Railroad had been purchased by Gennessee and Wyoming, but owner Jerry Joe Jacobson still maintained a small collection of vintage equipment, including No. 1293 and sister engine No. 1278, at his Age of Steam Roundhouse, near Sugarcreek. No. 1293 is currently out on static display as of 2023 and is awaiting a rebuild and inspection after McCloud Railway 2-8-2 No. 19 finishes its rebuild.

Surviving sister engines 
 No. 1201 is currently on static display inside the Canada Science and Technology Museum in Ottawa, Ontario in Canada.
 No. 1238 is currently in storage under private ownership at the Prairie Dog Central Railway in Winnipeg, Manitoba in Canada.
 No. 1246 is currently in storage at the Railroad Museum of New England in Thomaston, Connecticut in the United States.
 No. 1278 is currently on static display at the Age of Steam Roundhouse in Sugarcreek, Ohio in the United States.
 No. 1286 is currently with No. 1238 in storage at the Prairie Dog Central Railway in Winnipeg, Manitoba in Canada.

References

External links
 Canadian Pacific 4-6-2 No. 1293

4-6-2 locomotives
1293
Steam locomotives of the United States
CLC locomotives
Individual locomotives of Canada
Preserved steam locomotives of Canada
Standard gauge locomotives of Canada
Standard gauge locomotives of the United States
Preserved steam locomotives of Ohio
Railway locomotives introduced in 1948